Malaj is an Albanian surname that may refer to 
Arben Malaj (born 1961), Albanian Minister of Finance and Economy
Arber Malaj (born 1989), Albanian football defender 
Argjend Malaj (born 1994), Kosovar-Albanian football midfielder 
Eni Malaj (born 1989), Albanian football goalkeeper
Geri Malaj (born 1989), Albanian footballer 
Soni Malaj (born 1981), Albanian singer

See also
Malaj Khand, a city and a municipality in India 

Albanian-language surnames